The 1901 Wilmington Conference Academy football team represented Wilmington Conference Academy (later known as Wesley College) in the 1901 college football season as an independent. Led by coach William M. Wooster in his first year, Wilmington compiled a record of 2–2 in games with known results.

Schedule

References

Wilmington Conference Academy
Wesley Wolverines football seasons
Wilmington Conference Academy football